That's Entertainment is a comics and collectibles store in Worcester, Massachusetts.

The store was first opened by Paul Howley in 1980 at a  location on Chandler Street in Worcester. On October 12, 1989, he added a second location with the purchase of a comic shop in Fitchburg, Massachusetts. At the start of business on July 1, 1992, That's Entertainment had been moved into its present location, a  former auto dealership on Park Ave. in Worcester, and a  retail and events space was created. The store stocks comic books, including alternative comics and new indy titles, trade paperbacks, and related items. The store also carries other trading cards, including sports cards and Magic: The Gathering, along with anime, role-playing games, vintage video games and systems, and other toys and collectibles.

In 1997, That's Entertainment was one of three stores that received a "Will Eisner Spirit of Comics Retailer Award" from Comic-Con International: San Diego. The award, named for comic book creator Will Eisner, recognizes "an individual retailer who has done an outstanding job of supporting the comics art medium both in the community and within the industry at large".

That's Entertainment's "reluctant acceptance of life after the on-line auction" was the subject of a six-page article in the May 2000 issue of the national magazine Inc. The article, by writer Anne Marie Borrego, was titled "How I Learned to Stop Worrying and (Almost) Love eBay." Borrego examined how That's Entertainment specifically, as a traditional brick and mortar collectibles retailer, was contending with the sudden growth of on-line competition in the collectibles market.

Events

On July 18, 1998, Harvey Ball, the earliest known designer of the Smiley, appeared at That's Entertainment to celebrate the 35th anniversary of the design's inception. Ball met fans and signed Smiley pins and art, as well as some copies of the Watchmen comic.

Television pioneer Rex Trailer appeared in 2006 to mark the 50th anniversary of Boomtown by meeting his fans, singing songs, and signing autographs. A video report on that event is posted to the Worcester Telegram website. In an encore of sorts, On September 11, 2011, Trailer appeared at the Fitchburg That's Entertainment to meet fans, sing songs and sign free autographs as he marked the 55th anniversary of Boomtown. Trailer sang a song he wrote to honor the victims of 9/11, I Appreciate You.

That's Entertainment has participated in the annual, worldwide Free Comic Book Day every year since the event was launched. In 2009, the store presented a "Pro-Am Comic Jam", inviting "aspiring artists of all ages" to meet with a group of professional artists to compare perspectives on comic art. It was the fourth occurrence of this event since 1996.

Lois Lane
In March 2011, That's Entertainment petitioned the Worcester City Council to change the name of the private street running alongside the store from Marmon Place to Lois Lane. "Certainly the character Lois Lane - dating back to 1938 in Superman comic books, and moving on through radio shows, television shows, and movies etc. - is a high-profile, beloved and timeless icon," the petition stated. The Worcester Telegram opined that the proposed name was a good match for That's Entertainment "which, among many things, is in the superhero comic book business." On August 14, 2012, the petition, having previously passed the Planning Board and The City Council Public Works Committee, gained the final approval of the full council. In welcoming the change, The Worcester Telegram declared "a bit of whimsy in Worcester is a good thing." On Friday December 28, 2012, the new sign was finally installed. A celebration at the store followed on Sunday December 30, 2012, featuring an unveiling, free sketches of Lois by Paul Ryan, and a Lois Lane lookalike contest. In July 2018 the sign, along with the pole to which it was attached, went missing after it was taken down during sidewalk construction and left laid at the side of the building overnight. About one month later, the Lois Lane sign was discovered abandoned behind a nearby shopping plaza, and was returned to the store. The street sign was reinstalled by the Worcester Department of Public Works within a week's time.

References

External links 
 That's Entertainment - official site

1980 establishments in Massachusetts
American companies established in 1980
Comics retailers
Companies based in Worcester, Massachusetts
Independent bookstores of the United States
Retail companies of the United States
Retail companies established in 1980
1980 in comics